Nyctibatrachus sanctipalustris (Coorg night frog or sacred swamp wrinkled frog) is a species of frog in the family Nyctibatrachidae from India. The specific name, sanctipalustris, "holy swamp" in Latin, refers to the type locality, "the sacred swamps of the Cauvery (river)...Coorg, India".

Distribution and habitat
Nyctibatrachus sanctipalustris is endemic to the Western Ghats, India. All known populations are within Karnataka state. It is a semi-aquatic species that lives in marshes within moist tropical forests.

Rediscovery
This species was described by C. R. Narayan Rao in 1920, and was thought to have been extinct after remaining unsighted for 91 years. Its rediscovery in 2011 coincided with the discovery of Nyctibatrachus poocha and others of the genus Nyctibatrachus by herpetologist Sathyabhama Das Biju.

References

Nyctibatrachus
Frogs of India
Endemic fauna of the Western Ghats
Taxa named by C. R. Narayan Rao
Amphibians described in 1920
Taxonomy articles created by Polbot